Mount Wachusett Community College (MWCC) is a public community college in Gardner, Massachusetts. Established by the Commonwealth of Massachusetts in 1963, it features an open admissions policy for the majority of its academic programs. MWCC offers more than 70 academic programs that allow students to earn either an associate of science degree (A.S.), associate of arts degree (A.A.), or a certificate.

Campuses
The 269-acre (1.09 km2) main campus is located on 444 Green Street in Gardner, Massachusetts. The college also maintains a satellite campus at One Jackson Place, 27 Jackson Road in Devens, Massachusetts and at 100 Erdman Way in Leominster, Massachusetts, and an Automotive Technology Facility on Linus Allain Ave in Gardner, Massachusetts. The college has an additional educational site in Fitchburg, Massachusetts where dental hygiene and dental assisting students take classes and offer free dental cleanings at 326 Nichols Road in Fitchburg, MA in partnership with Community Health Center of Fitchburg, MA.

Sustainability
The college has been praised for its use of renewable energy, winning the National Wildlife Federation's "Chill-Out: Campus Solutions to Global Warming" competition in the spring of 2007.
 
Renewable energy technologies at the college include: Solar PhotoVoltaic panels originally producing 5 kilowatts and upgraded to 97.24 kilowatts in September 2009. and a biomass plant which heats the college by burning waste woodchips.
 
The college also uses a biomass gasification generator, where woodchips are turned into combustible gases, which are used in a gasoline engine, powering a generator that produces 50 kilowatts of electricity. This is a research and development project contracted with the U.S. Department of Energy.
 
Two Vestas V82 1.65 MW wind turbines were activated in March 2011 which are expected to generate 97 percent of the college's annual electricity demand.

Service area
Mount Wachusett Community College serves the following 29 cities and towns in North Central Massachusetts:
 Ashburnham, Massachusetts
 Ashby, Massachusetts
 Athol, Massachusetts
 Ayer, Massachusetts
 Barre, Massachusetts
 Clinton, Massachusetts
 Fitchburg, Massachusetts
 Gardner, Massachusetts
 Groton, Massachusetts
 Hardwick, Massachusetts
 Harvard, Massachusetts 
 Hubbardston, Massachusetts
 Lancaster, Massachusetts
 Leominster, Massachusetts
 Lunenburg, Massachusetts
 Oakham, Massachusetts
 Orange, Massachusetts
 Pepperell, Massachusetts
 Petersham, Massachusetts
 Royalston, Massachusetts
 Phillipston, Massachusetts
 Princeton, Massachusetts
 Rutland, Massachusetts
 Shirley, Massachusetts
 Sterling, Massachusetts
 Templeton, Massachusetts
 Townsend, Massachusetts
 Winchendon, Massachusetts
 Westminster, Massachusetts

Academics

Early college and dual enrollment
Mount Wachusett Community College offers multiple programs that offer high school/home school juniors and seniors the chance to enroll in college classes prior to their high school graduation. Mount Wachusett Community College is accredited by the New England Commission of Higher Education.
 
 Dual Enrollment: Dual Enrollment allows the student to focus on courses that will be transferable to most two-year and four-year public and private institutions, while simultaneously completing their high school graduation requirements. Selected students are enrolled in either a part-time or full-time college-level course load depending on their program and course needs. Dual Enrollment students are considered MWCC students and as such will be awarded the same academic support privileges as other MWCC students. Courses are limited and applicants from local high schools are given priority.
 Pathways Early College Innovation School: Mount Wachusett Community College partners with the Ralph C. Mahar Regional School District to offer an Early College High School opportunity to 20 motivated students with the opportunity to earn their high school diploma and an associate degree simultaneously. The Pathways program covers the cost of course tuition and fees for enrolled students. These students complete their junior and senior years of high school while taking courses at MWCC. Students must fulfill all state and educational requirements to meet high school diploma and associate degree requirements, which also includes passing the MCAS. Admissions are competitive. Applicants are required to have a minimum 3.0 GPA from their high school, be at least 16 years old, have a recommendation from their high school, and must be willing to enroll in classes during all available MWCC semesters.
 Gateway to College: Gateway to College is a dual enrollment opportunity especially for students who either have not experienced success in the traditional high school setting. The program is for students who have dropped out of high school or are at risk of dropping out. Gateway students have the opportunity to earn a high school diploma with the added benefit of receiving free college credits toward an associate degree or certificate through a variety of career-focused pathways. The Gateway to College Program provides tuition, fees, and first-semester books for enrolled students and is funded through Chapter 70 School Choice funds from the Ralph C. Mahar Regional School District.

Adult education
An Adult Education program prepares adults without high school degrees to complete their high school equivalency exam (GED/HiSET). These students are then eligible to continue their education at the college level at Mount Wachusett Community College or any other institution.

Workforce development
The college provides corporate instruction and workforce development training for local businesses. Services include assisting companies with accessing Workforce Training Fund grants and delivering customized training.

English as a Second Language (ESL)
ESL students receive personalized instruction in a computer/media lab at the campus in Leominster, MA.  Courses are taught at 4 levels: beginning, advanced beginning, intermediate, and advanced.

Continuing education
The college offers noncredit classes for personal enrichment year-round as part of its Lifelong Learning program.

Student services
MWCC students enjoy many support services and resources including free tutoring in the Academic Support Center, subsidized childcare, career planning assistance, disability support, food assistance, counseling, and veteran services.

Mount Fitness
Mount Fitness is the college's 65,000-square foot gymnasium. It is open to the public and offers memberships for individuals and families. Membership fees include group fitness/yoga classes, pool use, and tanning.  The facility includes:
 Olympic sized swimming pool with 6 lanes
 (3)full-size, indoor basketball courts
 Outdoor tennis and basketball courts
 200-meter outdoor track
 (2) Regulation racquetball courts
 Weight training and cardiovascular equipment
 On-site nursery

Theatre at the Mount
The college's theatre hosts a sizable community theatre program.  Started in the autumn of 1976 (under the name "Theatre North Central"), notably through the Eastern Massachusetts Association of Community Theatres (EMACT) and New England Theatre Conference (NETC)

TAMY Awards
In 2006, Theatre at the Mount launched the TAMY Award program for high school musical theatre.  Modeled after Broadway's Tony Awards, the TAMYs evaluate high school performances within a 50-mile radius of the college based on a number of criteria, including (among others)Best Actor, Best Actress, Best Featured Ensemble and Best Overall Production.

See also
List of colleges and universities in Massachusetts

References

External links

Official website
 

Community colleges in Massachusetts
Educational institutions established in 1963
Universities and colleges in Worcester County, Massachusetts
1963 establishments in Massachusetts